Vanilla pilifera is a species of vanilla orchid. It is native to Southeast Asia.

Distribution 
Vanilla pilifera is found only in Malay Peninsula and peninsular Thailand. Vanilla pilifera is cultivated at the Hortus Botanicus in Leiden. Scattered in dry evergreen forest.

Description 
Monopodial terrestrial climbing orchid, stem and leaves succulent, rooting from node, internode 7–10 cm. Leaves thick, oblong, 10–14 cm; apex acute; base obtuse; petioles 1–1.5 cm. Inflorescences arise from node, ca 5 cm. long, with 6-12 flowers; bracts 0.5–1 cm. long; pedicels 5–6 cm long. Sepal 3, free, oblong-lanceolate, greenish, shiny, 3–3.4 cm long. Lateral petals similar to sepals; labellum whitish pink with dark purple veins inside, ca 3 cm long with appendage hairs at apex down to the mouth close to 8-10 scales of brush, hairs ca 0.5 cm long; lower inside in front column dark red; column 1–1.8 cm long, most part connate to labellum; operculum green.

Notes

References 
 Plant of the month April, 2007 Vanilla pilifera Holttum

pilifera
Orchids of Malaya
Orchids of Thailand
Flora of Peninsular Malaysia